Hachette Distribution Services is the distribution arm of French media group Hachette.  In Canada and the United States, they operate a specialty retail chain under the name HDS Retail.  HDS Retail chains are found in airports, hotels, and malls across North America. HDS is a wholly owned subsidiary of Lagardere Services, which is the largest travel retailer, with over 1,600 stores in 18 countries covering 4 continents.

References

External links
 HDS Retail North America

Retail companies of France